Yutaka Ohashi (August 19, 1923 – July 4, 1989) was a Japanese American artist.

He studied at Tokyo University of the Arts for 3 years, under the painter Gen’ichirō Inokuma. He later went to the School of the Museum of Fine Arts, Boston.

Art 
Ohashi's style is broadly included in the Abstract Expressionism movement, combined with the aesthetics of traditional Japanese art. His work, Stone garden which appears in the Guggenheim currently (2019), draws upon the idea of the Japanese rock garden. 

His techniques are identified by the Guggenheim: "Ohashi was known for paintings that integrated the restrained, purposeful act of collage, adding texture and changing registers of density to large, encompassing abstract forms. He added semitransparent layers of rice paper to the foreground of his paintings and, at times, partly obscured the rice paper with layers of oil paint. This technique, combined with large swaths of negative space and occasional highlights in gold leaf, contributes to fluctuating perceptions of space within Ohashi’s compositions".

References

External links
https://www.guggenheim.org/artwork/artist/yutaka-ohashi
http://www.askart.com/askart/o/yutaka_ohashi/yutaka_ohashi.aspx

1923 births
1989 deaths
Japanese emigrants to the United States
People from Hiroshima
Tokyo University of the Arts alumni